Full disclosure or Full Disclosure may refer to:

Computers 
 Full disclosure (computer security), in computer security the practice of publishing analysis of software vulnerabilities as early as possible
 Full disclosure (mailing list), a mailing list about computer security

Film and television 
 Full Disclosure (2001 film), a 2001 thriller film
 Full Disclosure (2005 film), a 2005 comedy/romance short film
 "Full Disclosure" (The West Wing), an episode of the TV series The West Wing
 "Full Disclosure" (Alias episode), an episode of the TV series Alias
 "Full Disclosure" (Steven Universe), an episode of the TV series Steven Universe
 "Full Disclosure" (Girls), an episode of the TV series Girls

Books 
 Full Disclosure (book), 2018 memoir by Stormy Daniels
 Full Disclosure (novel), a 1978 novel by William Safire; see List of fictional presidents of the United States (E–F)

Music 
 "Full Disclosure", a song by Fugazi from their 2001 album The Argument
 "Full Disclosure (Part 1)" and "Full Disclosure (Part 2)", musical numbers in The Addams Family musical

See also
 Disclosure (disambiguation)
 Conflict of interest, a situation in which a person or organization is involved in multiple interests, which may require disclosure 
 Disclosure of evidence, in common law jurisdictions, procedure to obtain evidence from the other party or parties before a lawsuit